Prozorov (masculine) or Prozorova (feminine) is a Russian surname and may refer to:

 Leonid Polonsky (1833–1913), Russian author and publisher who used the moniker Prozorov
 Mikhail Prozorov, architect who designed many buildings in Vilnius, including Alexander Nevsky Church
 Nikolai Prozorov, executed priest canonized by the Russian Orthodox Church in 1981; see August 6 (Eastern Orthodox liturgics)
 Olga, Marina, Irina, and Andrei Sergeyevich Prozorov, three sisters and their brother in Chekhov's 1901 play Three Sisters

See also
 Prozorovsky, Russian noble family

Russian-language surnames